The National Oceanic and Atmospheric Administration, in cooperation with the U.S. Fish and Wildlife Service and Environmental Protection Agency, groups steelhead and salmon into distinct population segments (DPS). There are currently 15 DPS for steelhead (Oncorhynchus mykiss) and 31 evolutionarily significant units (ESU) for five species of Pacific salmon Oncorhynchus.  The boundaries of these areas are used to determine whether specific populations of a species should be designated threatened or endangered species under the Endangered Species Act.

Steelhead distinct population segment

Pacific salmon evolutionarily significant unit

Notes

Endangered fauna of the United States
Oncorhynchus

Trout